Külsheim is a town in the Main-Tauber district, in Baden-Württemberg, Germany. It is situated 12 km northwest of Tauberbischofsheim, and 10 km south of Wertheim am Main.

Town districts (former independent municipalities)
 Külsheim
 Eiersheim
 Hundheim
 Steinbach
 Steinfurt
 Uissigheim

Twin towns
  Moret-sur-Loing, France, since 1972
  Pécsvárad, Hungary, since 1992

References

Main-Tauber-Kreis
Baden
Historic Jewish communities